Sofa surfing, also known as couch surfing, is the practice of staying in another's house for free

It can also refer to:

 Sofa Surfers (band), an Austrian rock and electronic music band
 Sofa Surfers (TV series), a 2009 British documentary
"Sofa Surfer Girl” (song), a song by The Orchid Highway

See also 

 Couch surfing (disambiguation)